The Face Vietnam season 2 is a Vietnamese modeling-themed reality television series, based on the US television series of the same name, and one of several national editions in the international The Face franchise. Lan Khuê, Hoàng Thùy and Minh Tú served as model coaches and Hữu Vi served as a host for the second season. The second season premiered on 11 June 2017 on VTV3.

Contestants 
(ages stated are at start of filming)

Episodes

Summaries

Elimination table

 The contestant was part of the winning team for the episode.
 The contestant was at risk of elimination.
 The contestant was eliminated from the competition.
 The contestant withdrew from the competition.
 The contestant was originally eliminated but returned to the competition.
 The contestant was a Runner-Up.
 The contestant won The Face.

 Episode 1 was the casting episode. The final twelve were divided into individual teams of four as they were selected.
 In episode 6, Lukkade Metinee replaced Lan Khuê as a mentor during elimination.
 In episode 7, Trúc Anh quit the competition while she was in the bottom two with Phan Ngân before Hoàng Thùy had made her decision.
 In episode 11, team Minh Tú won the campaign. Hoàng Thùy nominated Tường Linh while Lan Khuê nominated Tú Hảo for elimination. Minh Tú decided not to eliminate either of them.  
 In episode 12, Mỹ Nhân returned to the competition after winning a popular vote out of the previously eliminated contestants.

Campaigns
 Episode 1: Shooting with smiley theme, video clip original face and selfie make connections (casting)
 Episode 2: Catwalk and shaping
 Episode 3: Catwalk on gravel
 Episode 4: Acting in music video
 Episode 5: Photography on sailboat and catwalk on the jetty
 Episode 6: Catwalk on the banquet table
 Episode 7: Photography in cold weather
 Episode 8: Roleplay "beauty blogger" for L'Oréal Paris
 Episode 9: Photography selfie color
 Episode 10: Filming of "Nữ Chiến Binh"
 Episode 11: Photography and record TVC TV Ads for LG
 Episode 12: Final walk

References 

2017 Vietnamese television seasons
Vietnam, 2